A referendum on the Spanish NATO membership was held in Spain on Wednesday, 12 March 1986. Voters were asked whether they ratified the national Government's proposal for the country remaining a member of the North Atlantic Treaty Organization (NATO), which it had joined in 1982.

The question asked was "The Government considers it convenient, for national interests, for Spain to remain in the Atlantic Alliance, and agrees that such permanence be established in the following terms: (1) Non-incorporation into NATO's military structure; (2) Prohibition on the installation, storage or entry of nuclear weapons on Spanish territory; (3) Gradual reduction of the United States' military presence in Spain. Question: In your view, should Spain continue to be a member of the Atlantic Alliance subject to the terms agreed by the national Government?".

The referendum resulted in 56.9% of valid votes in favour of remaining within NATO on a turnout of 59.4%.

Opinion polls
The table below lists voting intention estimates in reverse chronological order, showing the most recent first and using the dates when the survey fieldwork was done, as opposed to the date of publication. Where the fieldwork dates are unknown, the date of publication is given instead. The highest percentage figure in each polling survey is displayed with its background shaded in the leading choice's colour. The "Lead" column on the right shows the percentage-point difference between the "Remain" and "Leave" choices in a given poll.

Results

Overall

Results by region

Notes

References
Opinion poll sources

Other

Further reading
Lawrence Leduc, The Politics of Direct Democracy. Referendums in Global Perspective (Broadview Press, 2003), p. 82.
Anthony Gooch, 'A Surrealistic Referendum: Spain and NATO', Government and Opposition 21(3), pp. 300–16.

1986
1986 in Spain
1986 referendums
NATO membership referendums
Membership referendum